The siege of Rome was fought between supporters of the Suebian warrior Ricimer and the Western Roman emperor Anthemius. Ricimer had previously established Anthemius as emperor, but later fell out with his nominee and attacked Rome. With the help of his Burgundian allies and the Germanic warrior Odoacer, Ricimer laid siege to Rome. After a five month siege and the defeat of a relief army from Gaul commanded by Bilimer, the city fell to Ricimer. Anthemius was killed, but Ricimer himself died shortly afterwards. Four years later, Odoacer established himself as King of Italy.

Sources
 

472
Rome 472
Rome 472
Battles involving the Suebi
Military history of Rome
Rome